The 2021–22 BBL season was the 35th season of the British Basketball League, the top British professional basketball league, since its establishment in 1987. The season featured 10 teams from across England and Scotland.

Teams

Arenas and locations

 On 23 June 2021, the owners of the Worcester Wolves withdrew their team from the BBL, citing financial issues arising from the Covid-19 pandemic as one of the main reasons for the decision.

 On 8 July 2021, Plymouth Raiders withdrew from the league due to an increase in the cost of rent at their home venue, the Plymouth Pavilions.

 On 30 July 2021, it was announced by the league that the city of Plymouth would have a franchise for the 2021–22 season.

 On 9 August 2021, Plymouth City Patriots were announced to join the British Basketball League for the 2021–22 season, led by local businessman Carl Heslop. The new organisation could not secure the transfer of the naming and branding rights of the Plymouth Raiders from Plymouth Raiders 1983 Ltd, the previous owners. The Patriots played their home games at the Plymouth Pavilions for one season only.

Personnel and sponsorship

Coaching changes

BBL Cup
The 2021–22 BBL Cup featured all 10 teams, split into 2 geographical groups, North and South. Each team played each other twice (once home, once away) with the top 4 teams in each group progressing to the quarter-finals. Single-legged quarter-finals and two-legged semi-finals matches determined the two finalists who contested the Cup final at Arena Birmingham.

Qualification Stage

North Group

South Group

Quarter-finals

Semi-finals

Cup final

BBL Championship

The BBL Championship retained the three-game series format from the previous season, for a 27-game regular season, played across 24 Rounds between 29 October 2021 to 24 April 2022.

On 6 April 2022, Leicester Riders were crowned league champions and won their 6th BBL Championship title.

Standings

BBL Trophy
The BBL Trophy retained the same, 16-team bracket format as introduced for the 2018–19 season. The ten BBL teams were joined in the first round draw by six invited teams; Solent Kestrels, Derby Trailblazers, Thames Valley Cavaliers and Hemel Storm, from the English Basketball League. Falkirk Fury from the Scottish Basketball Championship and Basketball Wales are the only additional teams outside of England.

First round

Quarter-finals

Semi-finals

Bristol Flyers v London Lions

Glasgow Rocks v Cheshire Phoenix

Trophy final

Playoffs
The BBL Playoffs returned to the two-legged aggregate series format used prior to the 2020–21 season. The BBL Playoff Final was played at The O2 Arena, London for the sixth time and saw Leicester Riders defeat London Lions.

Bracket

Quarter-finals

(1) Leicester Riders vs. (8) Plymouth City Patriots

(2) Sheffield Sharks vs. (7) Glasgow Rocks

(3) London Lions vs. (6) Cheshire Phoenix

(4) Bristol Flyers vs. (5) Manchester Giants

Semi-finals

(1) Leicester Riders vs. (7) Glasgow Rocks

(3) London Lions vs. (4) Bristol Flyers

Playoff final

(1) Leicester Riders vs. (3) London Lions

Awards

2021–22 BBL Team of the Year 

Source: 2021–22 Molten BBL Team of the Year

2021–22 BBL All-British Team of the Year 

Source: 2021–22 BBL All-British Team of the Year

2021–22 BBL Defensive Team of the Year 

Source: 2021–22 BBL Defensive Team of the Year

 Most Valuable Player: Geno Crandall (Leicester Riders)
 Play-off Final MVP: Geno Crandall (Leicester Riders)
 Coach of the Year: Rob Paternostro (Leicester Riders)

British clubs in European competitions

References

External links

British Basketball League seasons
2021–22 in British basketball
Britain